But, What Ends When The Symbols Shatter? is an album by Death in June, released in 1992. The first edition was issued as a gold disc in a white digipak with the artwork on the enclosed booklet.

"He's Disabled", "The Mourner's Bench", "Because of Him", and "Little Black Angel" are covers/re-interpretations of songs from Jim Jones' People's Temple Choir 1973 gospel album He's Able. The original songs were "He's Able", "Something's Got a Hold of Me", "Because of Him", and "Black Baby", respectively.

The album cover photography of a statue was taken in Foro Italico.

Track listing
"Death is the Martyr of Beauty" – 3:50
"He's Disabled" – 4:08
"The Mourner's Bench" – 2:31
"Because of Him" – 3:46
"Dædalus Rising" – 4:52
"Little Black Angel" – 4:18
"The Golden Wedding of Sorrow" – 3:36
"The Giddy Edge of Light" – 5:07
"Ku Ku Ku" – 1:52
"This is not Paradise" – 5:27
"Hollows of Devotion" – 3:29
"But, What Ends When the Symbols Shatter?" – 3:15

References

Death in June albums
1992 albums